The Other Side is a five-issue 2006 Vietnam War-themed comic book mini-series published by DC Comics as a part of its Vertigo imprint. It was written by Jason Aaron and illustrated by Cameron Stewart. Stewart travelled to Vietnam to do extensive visual research.

Story
It tells parallel stories of an American soldier, PFC Bill Everette, and a North Vietnamese soldier, Vo Binh Dai, as they join their respective armies. As they fight for their countries, the horror of the war wears upon their soul and sanity.

Collection
It was reprinted in a hardcover collection by Image Comics in 2017.

Awards
 The Other Side received 2007 Eisner Award nomination for Best Limited Series.

References

External links
 Descent into Hell: Aaron talks The Other Side, February 24, 2006, Comic Book Resources

2006 comics debuts
Vertigo Comics limited series
War comics
Comics by Jason Aaron
Comics set during the Vietnam War